Kimball is a town in Marion County, Tennessee, United States. The population was 1,545 at the 2020 census and 1,395 in 2010. It is part of the Chattanooga, TN–GA Metropolitan Statistical Area.

History 
Kimball was founded in 1890 as a model industrial city by Hannibal Kimball, with support of the British Anglo-American Company, Limited. The location was chosen to be similar to another planned city, Colorado Springs.
It was backed by mountains, with three miles of frontage on the Tennessee River and rail connections on the Nashville, Chattanooga and St. Louis Railway.

The town suffered damage after it was struck by an EF 2 tornado on November 14, 2007. The storm left nine injured, along a damage path of approximately two miles in length.

Geography
Kimball is located at  (35.046956, -85.674476).

Demographics

2020 census

As of the 2020 United States census, there were 1,545 people, 683 households, and 526 families residing in the town.

2000 census
As of the census of 2000, there were 1,312 people, 563 households, and 389 families residing in the town. The racial makeup of the town was 97.48% White, 0.99% African American, 0.53% Native American, and 0.99% from two or more races. Hispanic or Latino of any race were 0.08% of the population.

There were 563 households, out of which 30.0% had children under the age of 18 living with them, 54.7% were married couples living together, 10.8% had a female householder with no husband present, and 30.9% were non-families. 29.1% of all households were made up of individuals, and 11.4% had someone living alone who was 65 years of age or older. The average household size was 2.33 and the average family size was 2.85.

The town's population was spread out, with 22.8% under the age of 18, 7.0% from 18 to 24, 29.0% from 25 to 44, 28.6% from 45 to 64, and 12.6% who were 65 years of age or older. The median age was 40 years. For every 100 females, there were 92.1 males. For every 100 females age 18 and over, there were 86.6 males.

The median income for a household in the town was $33,359, and the median income for a family was $41,094. Males had a median income of $31,141 versus $21,382 for females. The per capita income for the town was $17,454. About 7.9% of families and 9.0% of the population were below the poverty line, including 10.0% of those under age 18 and 8.4% of those age 65 or over.

Education
Kimball is home to a satellite campus of Chattanooga State Community College.

References

External links
Kimball History

Towns in Marion County, Tennessee
Towns in Tennessee
Chattanooga metropolitan area
Populated places established in 1890
Tennessee populated places on the Tennessee River